Pranutan Bahl (born 10 March 1993) is an Indian actress and a professional lawyer, who primarily works in Hindi films. She is the daughter of actors Mohnish Bahl and Ekta Sohini. Bahl made her acting debut with Notebook (2019) for which she received Filmfare Award for Best Female Debut nomination. She has since starred in Helmet (2021).

Early life and background
Bahl was born on 10 March 1993 to actors Mohnish Bahl and Ekta Sohini in Mumbai, Maharashtra. She is the granddaughter of actress Nutan and Rajnish Bahl. She is also the grandniece of Tanuja and the niece of Kajol and Tanisha Mukerji.

She completed her graduation in Legal Science & Law (B.L.S. LLB) from Government Law College and obtained Master of Laws (LLM) degree from University of Mumbai, both in Mumbai. Bahl is a professional lawyer.

Career
Bahl started her career with the short film Essential Like No Other, portraying Kaira Khanna. 

Bahl made her film debut in 2019 with Notebook opposite Zaheer Iqbal. She portrayed a Kashmiri teacher, Firdaus Quadri. Bollywood Hungama noted, "Pranutan Bahl is stunning and has a supreme screen presence. She delivers a first-rate performance." India Today mentioned, "Keeping with the simplicity of their characters, Pranutan and Zaheer bring out the innocence they are required to". She received Screen Award for Best Female Debut and Filmfare Award for Best Female Debut nominations for her performance.

Bahl next appeared in the 2021 film Helmet, opposite Aparshakti Khurana. The film tries to change the taboo and hesitancy associated with use of condoms in India. She portrayed Rupali, a girl who supplies floral arrangements in weddings. It released on ZEE5. Deccan Herald noted, "Pranutan, impresses in a couple of scenes but deserved a meatier role". While Times of India said, "She portrays her character convincingly".

Filmography

Films

Music videos

Awards and nominations

See also 
 List of Hindi film actresses
 List of Indian film actresses

References

External links

1993 births
Living people
Indian film actresses
21st-century Indian actresses